Amber Dawn Stevens West is an American actress. She is best known for her roles as Ashleigh Howard in the ABC Family series Greek (2007–2011), Maxine in the NBC sitcom The Carmichael Show (2015–2017), and Claire Davis in the CBS comedy Happy Together (2018–2019). She has also appeared in films The Amazing Spider-Man (2012), 22 Jump Street (2014) and Jessabelle (2014). She played the lead role of Maya in the 2018 comedy film Love Jacked.

Early life 
Stevens West was born Amber Dawn Stevens in Los Angeles, California, the daughter of former model Beverly Cunningham and radio announcer Shadoe Stevens; She has a younger sister named Chyna and an older paternal half-brother named Brad. Stevens is of mixed ethnicity, being born to a Caucasian father and African-American mother who is also part Comanche.

Stevens West is a graduate of Beverly Hills High School.

Career
Early in her career, she appeared in television commercials for Old Navy, Verizon, Logitech and Neutrogena. She made her television acting debut in an episode of Complete Savages in 2005. In 2007, Stevens West began portraying Ashleigh Howard on the ABC Family comedy-drama television series Greek. In a review released soon after the premiere of the show, the Pittsburgh Post-Gazette called the show "light-hearted fun" and "authentic" while The New York Times claimed that Greek "captures the spirit of the hedge-fund age like nothing else." The series concluded after four seasons on March 7, 2011. She has appeared in films The Fast and the Furious: Tokyo Drift (2006), Fired Up! (2009), The Amazing Spider-Man (2012), The Kitchen (2012) and Jessabelle (2014).

She has appeared in guest roles on How I Met Your Mother, Friends with Benefits, Baby Daddy, 90210, Ben and Kate and New Girl. In 2011, Stevens West played the role of Mimi Marquez in the musical Rent: Downtown L.A. She made a guest appearance as Joy Struthers on CBS' Criminal Minds, in the episode "Fate". In 2014, she appeared as Jonah Hill's character's love interest called Maya in the comedy film 22 Jump Street. The film received positive reviews, with some critics calling it one of the best comedy sequels of all time, and grossed $331 million worldwide.

In 2015, Stevens West co-starred opposite Jerrod Carmichael as Maxine in the NBC comedy sitcom The Carmichael Show. In 2017, following that show's end, Stevens West was cast as a series regular on the FOX supernatural comedy series Ghosted. She portrayed a restaurant and bar designer Claire Davis opposite Damon Wayans Jr. on CBS' comedy television series Happy Together (2018–2019). The series followed a young couple whose lives are suddenly thrown into chaos when a pop star moves into their home.

In May, 2021, Stevens starred as one of the four leads in the first season of the ensemble comedy Run the World on Starz.

In November, 2022, Stevens was a contestant on the new daytime game show, PICTIONARY, eps. 01114

Personal life
Stevens began dating actor Andrew J. West after they met while co-starring in Greek. They married on December 5, 2014, in Los Angeles. They have two daughters: Ava Laverne, and Winona Marie.

Filmography

Film

Television

References

External links

21st-century American actresses
American film actresses
African-American actresses
American television actresses
Living people
Actresses from Beverly Hills, California
Actresses from Los Angeles
Beverly Hills High School alumni
American people of Comanche descent
21st-century African-American women
21st-century African-American people
20th-century African-American people
20th-century African-American women
Year of birth missing (living people)